Yohan Brun (born 19 September 1994) is a French professional footballer who plays as a forward for  club Versailles.

Club career
On 2 January 2019, Brun joined signed his first professional contract with Grenoble after a successful start of the 2018–19 season with Hyères. He made his professional debut with Grenoble in a 0–0 Ligue 2 tie with Le Havre on 12 December 2019.

In January 2020, Brun was released by Grenoble and signed a two and a half year contract with Laval. In January 2022, he joined Versailles.

Honours 
Versailles

 Championnat National 2: 2021–22

References

External links
 
 

1994 births
Living people
Sportspeople from Hyères
Association football forwards
French footballers
Hyères FC players
Grenoble Foot 38 players
Stade Lavallois players
FC Versailles 78 players
Ligue 2 players
Championnat National players
Championnat National 2 players
Footballers from Provence-Alpes-Côte d'Azur